An échevin, sometimes translated as alderman, is a member of the administration of a Luxembourgian commune.  Together, they form the collège échevinal, which helps the mayor run the administration.  In most communes, échevins have designated roles within the administration, adopting separate briefs as in a cabinet.

Échevins are elected by the commune's council, and represent the make-up of the governing coalition.  Formally, échevins of cities are named by the Grand Duke, whilst those of other communes are named by the Minister for the Interior.  Échevins must be members of the communal council and hold Luxembourgian nationality.

Most communes have two échevins, but more-populous ones are allowed more if granted that right by Grand Ducal decree: communes with 10,000 to 19,999 inhabitants may have 3 échevins, communes with 20,000 or more may have 4 échevins, and Luxembourg City may have up to six.

Notes

References
 Administrative code on the organisation of communes

Local government in Luxembourg